Turallin is a town and a locality in the Toowoomba Region, Queensland, Australia.

History 
The town takes its name from a village in Ireland.

Pine Creek Provisional School opened on 4 September 1888. On 27 July 1904 it was renamed Turallin Provisional School. On 1 January 1909 it became Turallin State School. It closed in 1960. It was at (present day) 606 Turallin Road.

In June 1911 tenders were called to erect an Anglican Church in Turallin. St Luke's Anglican church was dedicated on 20 October 1913 by the Archdeacon of Toowoomba, Arthur Rivers. Its last service was held on 26 July 1953.

Road infrastructure
The Millmerran–Cecil Plains Road runs along the eastern boundary.

References

Further reading

External links 
 Town map of Turallin, 1947

Towns in Queensland
Toowoomba Region
Localities in Queensland